Vidi Bilu (Hebrew: וידי בילו; born 6 January 1959) is an Israeli film director.

Biography 
Vidi Bilu was born in Jerusalem in 1959. She studied between 1983 and 1985 at the photography department of Hadassah College. She began to study cinema in 1986, at the School of Beit Zvi, and specialised in direction in 1989. The director of many publicity films, and at the same time, editor and producer, she has directed many films, such as Close to Home in 2005.

Filmography 
 2005 : Close to Home
 2002 : Yes or no
 1995 : Monologues
 1993 : Thirty times four

References 
 

1959 births
Living people
Israeli film directors